Normacot railway station served the Normacot area of Stoke-on-Trent, England. It was opened in 1882 by the North Staffordshire Railway on its line to Derby.

The station closed in 1964 and nothing remains of the station today.

References

Further reading

Disused railway stations in Stoke-on-Trent
Railway stations in Great Britain closed in 1964
Railway stations in Great Britain opened in 1882
Former North Staffordshire Railway stations
Beeching closures in England